Charles Edward Quail, M.D. was born on October 9, 1841 and died on December 21, 1910 in Harrisburg, Pennsylvania.  He served as a Republican Pennsylvania State Senator from 1901 until 1908.

Dr. Quail was born in Baltimore, Maryland, the son of Conrad Quail (1814-1845), born in Alsace, and his wife Mary Ports (1810-1887) of Manchester, Maryland.  He attended the Baltimore public schools, Mount Irvin College, and the University of Maryland Medical School where he left his studies to enlist in the Army during the Civil War in 1862. He served in the 8th Maryland Volunteer Infantry (Union), Baltimore, the “Maryland Brigade”. He saw action in (among others) Antietam; the Gettysburg Campaign; the Wilderness; and was wounded at Spotsylvania Courthouse.  At Laurel Hill, Quail took command after all officers had been killed or wounded.  After recuperating, Quail continued action at Cold Harbor; the Siege of Petersburg; and finally Appomattox Court House, April 9, 1865.Historical Biographies, Pennsylvania State Senate, Charles E. Quail (Retrieved April 7, 2019  He left the Army on May 31, 1865.

Quail returned to his medical studies and graduated, interning in Baltimore.  In 1867 he moved to Auburn, Pennsylvania to begin his practice of medicine. On June 4, 1867 he married Emma Catherine Weishampel (1843-1917) of Shiremanstown, Cumberland County, Pennsylvania.Historical Biographies, Pennsylvania State Senate, Charles E. Quail (Retrieved April 7, 2019 They had five children.

Dr. Quail in addition to his medical practice conducted several businesses including a drug business and then the Auburn Bolt and Nut Works as President. He also began service in public endeavors becoming a County Coroner and (Civil War) Pension Examiner, where he worked until his election to the State Senate in 1900.  He served as a State Senator until 1908.  Later he became a member and treasurer of the Auburn school board; chair of the county Republican committee; and was member of numerous civic, fraternal, and military veteran organizations, including the Gettysburg Battlefield Memorial Commission.

In 1910, Quail traveled to Harrisburg confer with Governor Edwin Sydney Stuart about reimbursing the railroads for providing transportation (for the old soldiers) to the dedication of the Gettysburg State Memorial.  He died suddenly in the Capitol Building on December 21, 1910.

References

1841 births
1910 deaths
Pennsylvania Republicans
20th-century American politicians